Río Verde (Spanish for "green river") is a river of Paraguay which flows along the Chaco region. It is a tributary of the Paraguay River. During the Paraguayan War, Paraguay's borders with Argentina were considered to be drawn using this river as reference. Due to president Rutherford B. Hayes' influence, however, the borders were instead drawn at Pilcomayo River.

See also
List of rivers of Paraguay

References
Rand McNally, The New International Atlas, 1993.
 GEOnet Names Server

Rivers of Paraguay